
Year 849 (DCCCXLIX) was a common year starting on Tuesday (link will display the full calendar) of the Julian calendar.

Events 
 By place 

 Europe 

 Summer – Battle of Ostia: A Saracen Arab fleet from Sardinia sets sail towards Rome. In response, Pope Leo IV forms a coalition of maritime Italian cities, including Naples, Amalfi and Gaeta, led by Admiral Caesar — which is assembled off the re-fortified port of Ostia — and repels the Saracen marauders. Their navy is scattered, resulting in many sunken vessels. Rome is saved from plunder and the expansion of the Aghlabids. 
 Frankish forces under King Charles the Bald invade southern France, and conquer the territory of Toulouse. He appoints Fredelo as count (comté) of Toulouse, who founds the Rouergue dynasty. Aquitaine is submitted to the West Frankish Kingdom.

 Abbasid Caliphate 
 The Armenian prince Bagrat II begins a rebellion against Caliph Al-Mutawakkil, of the Abbasid Caliphate.

 Asia 
 In the Chinese capital city of Chang'an, an imperial prince is impeached during the Tang Dynasty from his position by officials at court, for erecting a building that obstructs a street in the northwesternmost ward in South Central Chang'an.
 King Pyinbya of Burma founds the city of Bagan, located in the Mandalay Region, and fortifies it with walls.

Births 
 May – Isma'il ibn Ahmad, Muslim emir (d. 907)
 Alfred the Great, king of Wessex (d. 899)
 Eric Anundsson, king of Sweden (d. 882)

Deaths 
 January 15 – Theophylact, Byzantine co-emperor (b. c.793)
 Ali ibn Muhammad, Idrisid emir of Morocco
 c. February – Harthamah ibn al-Nadr al-Jabali, Muslim governor
 June – Ali ibn al-Madini, Muslim scholar (b. 778)
 c. June? – Ragenar, bishop of Amiens
 August 18 – Walafrid Strabo, Frankish theological writer
 Conaing mac Flainn, king of Brega (Ireland)
 Connagan, bishop of Clonfert (Ireland)
 Guntbold, archbishop of Rouen
 Itakh (Ītākh al-Khazarī), Muslim general
 Zhang Zhongwu, Chinese general

References